Tokyo Road: The Best of Bon Jovi – Rock Tracks (Japanese: ＴＯＫＹＯ　ＲＯＡＤ～ベスト・オブ・ボン・ジョヴィ－ロック・トラックス) is the third overall greatest hits compilation album by American rock band Bon Jovi, exclusively released in Japan in 2001, where it charted at number five. The album has sold more than 400,000 copies in Japan and been certified double platinum by the Recording Industry Association of Japan (RIAJ).

Content
The first track is a remixed version of "One Wild Night" originally released on the Crush album; the new version was released as a single and featured a music video. This version also appears on the Bon Jovi live compilation One Wild Night Live 1985–2001.

"Tokyo Road" (Live) was released as a promo single in Japan to promote the compilation album. It was also included as a bonus disc on a limited edition of the album. The live version of "Tokyo Road" would later appear on the 2010 special edition of 7800° Fahrenheit.

Track listing
"One Wild Night 2001"
"Bad Medicine"
"Livin' on a Prayer"
"You Give Love a Bad Name"
"Keep the Faith"
"It's My Life"
"Blood on Blood"
"Something for the Pain"
"Born to Be My Baby"
"Tokyo Road"
"Hey God"
"Just Older"
"I'll Sleep When I'm Dead"
"Runaway"
"Wild in the Streets"
"Next 100 Years"

Initial first pressing 3" bonus disc
"Tokyo Road" (live version)
"Not Fade Away" (live version from Jon Bon Jovi solo tour)
"Next 100 Years" (live version)
"Father Time" (live version from Richie Sambora solo tour)

Personnel
Jon Bon Jovi – lead vocals, acoustic guitar
Richie Sambora – guitar, backing vocals
Hugh McDonald – bass guitar, backing vocals
Tico Torres – drums, percussion
David Bryan – keyboards, backing vocals
Alec John Such – bass, backing vocals

Certifications

References

Bon Jovi compilation albums
2001 greatest hits albums